Berislavić family of Grabarje, also known as Berislavić family of Dobor, was a Croatian noble family from the Požega County of Slavonia, allegedly originating from Ban Borić.

History 
According to the family tradition Ban Borić of Bosnia, ruled from 1154 until c.1167, was an ancestor of the family. The family was most prominent during second half 15th and first half of 16th century. Members of the family served as Bans of Jajce, and titular Despots of Serbia.

Notable members
Franjo Berislavić (died in 1517), Ban of Jajce between 1494 and 1495, and from 1499 until 1503.
Ivaniš Berislavić (died in 1514), titular Despot of Serbia (1503-1514), and Ban of Jajce from 1511 until 1513.
Bartol Berislavić, Ban of Jajce in 1507.
Stjepan Berislavić (died in 1535), titular Despot of Serbia, from 1520 until his death in 1535.

References

Sources

Further reading
 Vjekoslav Klaić, Trpimir Macan. Povijest Hrvata od najstarijih vremena do svršetka XIX stoljeća. Nakladni zavod MH, 1981
 Pavić, Emerik. Ramus viridantis olivae. Budim, 1766

External links
 Hrvatska enciklopedija: Berislavići Grabarski (Doborski)

Berislavić noble family
Bosnian noble families
Croatian nobility
Serbian Despotate
History of Slavonia
14th century in Croatia
15th century in Croatia
16th century in Croatia